Sinawi, sometimes spelled shinawi, is a traditional  Korean music. It is performed improvisationally by a musical ensemble, and traditionally accompanies the rites of Korean shamanism. The style first emerged in the Chungcheong and Jeolla provinces, but is now widespread.  The traditional sinawi ensemble followed the principle of sam-hyeon-yuk-gak (三絃六角), with two flutes, a haegeum, a daegeum, a janggu hourglass-drum, and a large buk drum. However, today other traditional Korean instruments such as the gayageum and geomungo are also often included.

See also
 Gut (ritual)
 Muak
 Sinism
 Korean culture

Korean styles of music
Korean traditional music